Kalladaikurichi is a panchayat town in Tirunelveli district in the Indian state of Tamil Nadu. Kalladaikurichi is very famous for coffee and south Indian snacks like murukku, thengoyal, cheedai, etc., This town is on the banks of Thamirabarani river.

Landmark
Sadai Udayar temple is in this area.

Demographics
 India census, Kalladaikurichi had a population of 25,710. Males constitute 49% of the population and females 51%. Kalladaikurichi has an average literacy rate of 78%, higher than the national average of 59.5%: male literacy is 86%, and female literacy is 71%. In Kalladaikurichi, 9% of the population is under 6 years of age.

References

Cities and towns in Tirunelveli district